Domenico Maria Bonavera (born c.1650; date of death unknown) was an Italian engraver. He was born in Bologna. He trained in engraving with his uncle Domenico Maria Canuti. His plates are chiefly etched and finished with the dry point. He engraved eighteen plates from the designs of Titian, for a textbook of anatomy. He completed prints depicting: The Baptism of Christ after Albani; St. Anne teaching the Virgin Mary to read, St. Theresa with the Infant Jesus, and a Martyrdom of St. Christiana after Canuti; a St. John preaching after Ludovico Carracci; Lot and his Daughters after Annibale Carracci; The Assumption fresco at the Cupola of the Duomo of Parma (1697); after Correggio

References

17th-century Italian painters
Italian male painters
Italian engravers
Italian Baroque painters
Painters from Bologna
Year of death unknown
Year of birth uncertain
Catholic engravers